Formanilide is the organic compound with the formula C6H5N(H)CHO.  It is the formamide of aniline.  It is a colorless solid.  The compound is an additive in rubber products as well as a common synthetic intermediate. For example, it is a precursor to the fungicide mepanipyrim.  Dehydration of formanilide gives phenylisocyanide.

References

Formamides
Anilides